Hepi or HEPI may refer to:

Hepi (name)
Hepi TV, a Serbian television network
Higher Education Price Index